Massimiliano Cappellini (born January 2, 1971 in Bollate) is a retired Italian professional football player.

He played 9 seasons (161 games, 25 games) in the Serie A for A.C. Milan, U.S. Foggia, Piacenza Calcio and Empoli F.C.

He represented Italy at the 1987 FIFA U-16 World Championship.

External links
 
 European Champions Cup/UEFA Champions League Winning Squads

1971 births
Living people
People from Bollate
Italian footballers
Italy youth international footballers
Serie A players
Serie B players
Serie C players
A.C. Milan players
A.C. Monza players
Piacenza Calcio 1919 players
Atalanta B.C. players
Como 1907 players
Calcio Foggia 1920 players
Empoli F.C. players
Competitors at the 1993 Mediterranean Games
Association football forwards
Mediterranean Games competitors for Italy
Footballers from Lombardy
Sportspeople from the Metropolitan City of Milan